Erin's Hope GAA was a GAA club located in Dungarvan, Co. Waterford. They were formed in 1895 when a split occurred in the Dungarvan team which resulted in the forming of two teams, one called Erins Hope, and the other called Shandon Rovers.

Honours

Waterford Senior Football Championship 3
 1896, 1897, 1898

References

External links
 https://web.archive.org/web/20080406210711/http://waterford.gaa.ie/page/senior_football.html
 https://web.archive.org/web/20110726005445/http://www.dungarvanmuseum.org/exhibit/categories/historicalarticles/article151/struggleforfreedom.pdf
 http://blog.waterfordmuseum.ie/2009_10_01_archive.html
 http://www.dohenygaa.com/page/1897---dohenys-reach-the-all-ireland-senior-final-21.aspx

Gaelic games clubs in County Waterford
Gaelic football clubs in County Waterford